Piet Cleij (born 27 May 1927 in Groningen — 7 January 2015 in Bilthoven) was a Dutch linguist. He was the former vice-secretary of the Union Mundial pro Interlingua and the chief lexicographer in the Interlingua community.

References

External links
 Homepage Piet Cleij
 Union Mundial pro Interlingua

Linguists from the Netherlands
1927 births
2015 deaths
Interlingua speakers
People from Groningen (city)